Martin Bernheimer (28 September 1936 – 29 September 2019) was a German-born American music critic who specialized in classical music. Described as "a widely respected and influential critic, who is particularly knowledgeable about opera and the voice", Bernheimer was the chief classical music critic of the Los Angeles Times from 1965 to 1996.

Early life and education
Martin Bernheimer was born in Munich, Germany on 28 September 1936, to Paul and Louise (née) Nassauer. His father was a partner of the antiques business Haus Bernheimer, while his mother was an artist; both parents were Jewish. Amid the Nazi's Kristallnacht—the Nazi's targeted destruction of Jewish homes, businesses, synagogues and other buildings—Paul's business was destroyed. Upon reading Mein Kampf, Louise urged the family to flee, but Paul demurred, commenting that "Oh, no, this is our Germany, the country of great philosophers and artists". Martin's sister later remarked that "I am sure Martin did not have any memory of Kristallnacht, when the Nazis came knocking in the middle of the night to arrest our father, kicking my brothers around while looting the apartment". Paul and his brothers were sent to the Dachau concentration camp, though an uncle successfully traded their freedom by giving the Nazis the family's estate in Venezuela.

He studied at Brown University and the Hochschule für Musik in Munich as well as with the musicologist Gustave Reese at New York University.

Career and later life
His career writing about music began in New York, writing for the New York Herald Tribune, working as an assistant to Irving Kolodin at the Saturday Review, and landing the position of music critic at the New York Post. In 1965 he moved to Los Angeles where he worked as the chief music and dance critic for the Los Angeles Times. During his thirty years with that paper, he was twice the recipient of ASCAP's Deems Taylor Award (1974 and 1978) and in 1982 won the Pulitzer Prize for Criticism. From 1996 until his semi-retirement in 2017, Bernheimer's work appeared mainly in Opera magazine and the Financial Times. Bernheimer lectured frequently and provided commentary for opera broadcasts.

He died one day after his 83rd birthday.

References

Further reading
 Fischer, Heinz Dietrich and Fischer, Erika J. (eds.), "Bernheimer, Martin", Complete biographical encyclopedia of Pulitzer Prize winners, 1917-2000, Walter de Gruyter, 2002, p. 20. 

1936 births
2019 deaths
American music critics
American music journalists
Opera critics
Classical music critics
Los Angeles Times people
Writers from New York (state)
Pulitzer Prize for Criticism winners
Brown University alumni
New York University alumni
People from Munich
German emigrants to the United States